Bedshiel is a village in the Scottish Borders area of Scotland on the B6456, six miles from Duns, two miles from Greenlaw, Longformacus and Westruther.

The Watch Water Reservoir, Millknowe Burn and Bogpark Burn are close by.

The Kaims

Bedshiel Esker was formed from gravel deposited by a subglacial stream.
Southern Uplands Partnership: Bedshiel Esker
Definition of Esker

See also
List of places in the Scottish Borders
List of places in Scotland
Anglo-Scottish border
Debatable lands

External links
Geograph image of Bedshiel, railway truck
RCAHMS entry for Bedshiel
SCRAN image: Bedshiel Kaims, Berwickshire
Streetmap: Bedshiel
'The Scotsman' article, January 2007:The Bedshiel Kaims

Villages in the Scottish Borders